Aina is a given name that is found in multiple cultures. It is typically a female name in Japan, Latvia, Malaysia, Balearic Islands, Catalonia, Bangladesh, and Scandinavia, also in Madagascar, and a male name in Yoruba or Female name in Edo Nigeria. Aina is a variant of Aino in Scandinavia, and means "always." In Latvia, the name Aina means "view, sight", and is a variant of the male name Ainārs.  In Japan, the name combines the Japanese words 愛 (ai) "love, affection" and 菜 (na) "vegetables, greens". In India and Bangladesh, Aina is the Hindi and Bengali word for "mirror." In the Arabic language Aina is derived from the word "Ain" meaning "eyes". In Hawaiian it literally means "that which feeds" it can also means "country". In Malagasy the word means "life".

People
, Japanese voice actress and singer 
Aina Bartmann (born 1959), Norwegian politician
Aina Berg (1902–1992), Swedish swimmer
 Aina Vivian Breen (1919-2007), Swedish-American O.G.
Aina Cid (born 1994), Spanish competitive rower
Aina Erlander (1902–1990), Swedish teacher
, Japanese singer and actress
Aina Karlsone (1935–2012), Latvian artist
, Japanese actress and singer
Aina Moll Marquès (1930-2019), Spanish philologist and politician
Aina More (born 1992), British actor and singer
Aina Muceniece (1924–2010), Latvian scientist
Aina Onabolu (1882–1963), Nigerian artist
Aina Owoniyi (born 1955), Nigerian politician
, Japanese voice actress
, Japanese ice hockey player

References 

Feminine given names
Finnish feminine given names
Japanese feminine given names
Latvian feminine given names
Norwegian feminine given names
Swedish feminine given names
Catalan feminine given names
Nigerian names